Atelecrinidae is a family of crinoids or feather stars in the phylum Echinodermata. It was first described by Francis Arthur Bather in 1899.

Genera
The following genera are in the family Atelecrinidae:
 Adelatelecrinus Messing, 2013
 Atelecrinus Carpenter, 1881
 Paratelecrinus Messing, 2013
 Sibogacrinus A. H. Clark (in A.H. Clark & A. M. Clark), 1967

References

Comatulida